EMW may stand for:
EMW Corporation, a Korea's electronics company, by KOSDAQ number in 079190.
Eisenacher Motorenwerk, a former East German manufacturer of automobiles and motorcycles and one-time Formula One participant
Elektro Mechanische Werke, a former German aircraft manufacturer
Electromagnetic wave, a phenomenon  that takes the form of self-propagating waves in a vacuum or in matter.
Evangelical Movement of Wales, a Christian organisation in Wales
Expeditionary maneuver warfare, a warfare concept of the United States Marine Corps
Evangelisches Missionswerk in Deutschland, an institute of the Evangelical Church in Germany
Enzyklopädie der Mathematischen Wissenschaften, known as Klein's encyclopedia